Bruce Wyche Bannister (born July 21, 1972) is an American politician. He is a member of the South Carolina House of Representatives from the 24th District, serving since 2006. He is a member of the Republican Party.

Bannister is Chair of the House Ways and Means Committee.

References

External links
 https://bannisterandwyatt.com/

Living people
1972 births
Republican Party members of the South Carolina House of Representatives
Politicians from Greenville, South Carolina
21st-century American politicians